The Homestead in Geneseo, New York is a historic house that was listed on the National Register of Historic Places in 1974.  It is also a contributing property within the Geneseo Historic District, and is described in the district's National Historic Landmark nomination. The house was built by William Wadsworth, and continues to be owned by the Wadsworth family of Geneseo, New York.

See also
List of Registered Historic Places in Livingston County, New York

References

Houses on the National Register of Historic Places in New York (state)
Houses in Livingston County, New York
National Register of Historic Places in Livingston County, New York